Boken or Bokan is a village in Union Council Raman of Gujar Khan Tehsil in the Punjab Province of Pakistan and is located at  with an altitude of .

It was most probably named after a Gujjar clan named Boken, which is still found here among local Gujjars in good numbers.

References

 Gujar Khan Tehsil
Villages in Punjab, Pakistan